Devanand Fulasing Chavan is a leader of Janata Dal (Secular) and a member of the Karnataka Legislative Assembly 2018 elected from Nagthan Assembly constituency.

Positions Held 

 Member of Karnataka Legislative Assembly - 2018.

References

1970 births
Janata Dal (Secular) politicians
Living people
Karnataka MLAs 2018–2023